George H. Streeton, AIA (born 1864) was an American architect who worked in New York during the first half of the twentieth century, primarily for Roman Catholic clients.

Early life and education
Streeton was born September 28, 1864, in Brooklyn, New York. He studied at the Ferrari Modeling School at Cooper Union and Cornell University. He worked for a time for the firm of Schickel and Ditmars before going into business under his own name.

Architectural practice
He designed numerous religious buildings for Roman Catholic congregations in the Archdiocese of New York and the Diocese of Brooklyn.

Works 

 Cathedral of St. James, Brooklyn
 St. Ambrose Church, 222 Tompkins and Dekalb Avenues, Brooklyn
 St. Cyril & St. Methodius and St. Raphael Church, Manhattan, New York
1910: The Church of the Guardian Angel Manhattan, New York (original church, replaced in 1930 by John Van Pelt)
 St. Charles Borromeo Church, Manhattan, New York
 St. Francis De Sales Church, Manhattan, New York (enlargement of church by O'Connor & Metcalf, 6 years earlier)
 St. Casimir Church, Yonkers, New York
 St. Patrick's Academy, Brooklyn, New York  Alterations to a catholic school on Kent Street, originally built in 1870.  Work done in 1901.
 St. Raymond Church Westchester, New York
 St. Peter's Church Rectory, Staten Island, New York (church by George Edward Harding & Gooch)

Works attributed to George H. Streeton 
St. Philip Neri Church, Bronx, New York

References

Architects from New York City
Defunct architecture firms based in New York City
Architects of Roman Catholic churches
1864 births
Year of death unknown
Cornell University alumni